The 1962 Kansas State Wildcats football team represented Kansas State University in the 1962 NCAA University Division football season.  The team's head football coach was Doug Weaver.  The Wildcats played their home games in Memorial Stadium.  The Wildcats finished the season with a 0–10 record with a 0–7 record in conference play.  They finished in eighth place.  The Wildcats scored just 39 points and gave up 283 points.

Schedule

References

Kansas State
Kansas State Wildcats football seasons
College football winless seasons
Kansas State Wildcats football